All forms of pornography in Armenia is illegal and punishable by up to 7 years in prison, and according to Article 263 of the criminal code, the production and dissemination of pornographic materials such as videos, images, or advertisements by up to 2 years in prison or is punishable by a fine of 500 times the minimum Armenian monthly salary.

See also

 Pornography laws by region
 Legality of child pornography

References

Armenian pornography